Villalonga is a municipality in the Valencian Community, Spain.

Villalonga may also refer to:

Villalonga FC, football club
Gabriel Alomar i Villalonga (1873–1941), Spanish poet, essayist and educator
José Villalonga Llorente (1919–1973), Spanish football manager
Juan Villalonga (born 1953), Spanish businessman
Luc Villalonga (born 1970), French footballer
Marthe Villalonga (born 1932), French actress
Pau Villalonga (died 1609), Spanish composer

See also
Jorge de Villalonga (born 1664), Spanish lawyer, general and viceroy
Llorenç Villalonga i Pons (1897–1980), Balearic writer and psychiatrist
de Vilallonga (disambiguation)